General Whitmore may refer to:

Edmund Whitmore (1819–1890), British Army lieutenant general
Edward Whitmore (1691–1761), British Army brigadier general
George Whitmore (British Army officer) (1775–1862), British Army major general
William Whitmore (British Army officer) (1714–1771), British Army lieutenant general